Sidney Spencer (born March 7, 1985) is an American professional basketball who most recently played for the Phoenix Mercury of the WNBA.

Born in Hoover, Alabama, Spencer attended the University of Tennessee, and in April 2007 led the team to the national championship.  That same month, she was selected in the second round of the WNBA draft by the Los Angeles Sparks.  She got off to an exceptional start in her rookie season, and as a fan favorite quickly worked her way into the team's starting line-up.

Early life 
Sidney Spencer was born March 7, 1985, to Stephen and Janice Spencer. She has two brothers, Brad, 27 and Scott, 25.

High school career 
Spencer received the 2003 Alabama Miss Basketball award. A product of Hoover, Alabama. Sidney joined the Lady Vols after an award-laden prep career. She was nicknamed the "Big Show" by her teammates and friends and was selected as a 2003 Adidas All-American. She was also honored as 2003 "Miss Basketball" by the Alabama Sports Writers Association (ASWA). Sidney was chosen as the ASWA 6A Player of the Year in 2003 for the second-consecutive season. Also selected as the Gatorade Alabama Player of the Year her senior year. She was named all-state in 2002 and 2003. Member of the state's Final Four All-Tournament Team in '03. Earned Most Valuable Player Honors in the Alabama-Mississippi All-Star Basketball Game following her 17-point, 14-rebound effort. She got picked as the No. 1 Super Senior by the Birmingham News. Led Hoover to a 32–3 mark en route to a state runner-up finish her senior season. She was recognized by Street and Smith's Magazine as an honorable mention All-American in 2002. Also recipient of player of the year awards from the Birmingham News, Birmingham Post-Herald and Over-The-Mountain following the '02 season. Was named state finals most valuable player as a sophomore after leading her team to a 32–3 record and a state championship. Also during the highly successful 2001 campaign, she was named to the state finals all-tournament team, the Northeast Regional All-Tournament team and the Birmingham News 6A All-Metro team. She concluded her high school career by establishing Hoover H.S. records with 1,743 points, 1,098 rebounds and 304 blocks. Also compiled 255 career steals and averaged a career double-double (16.3 ppg and 10.3 rpg). In addition to basketball, Sidney earned two letters with the volleyball team and served as captain one season.

Tennessee Highlights 
2003–04: As a rookie, Sidney helped solidify the Lady Vols' interior presence both offensively and defensively with her athleticism and imposing size. She played in all 35 games and averaged 5.5 ppg and 3.5 rpg. She logged 16.8 minutes per contest as one of the Lady Vols' top reserves. Tallied double-figure scoring in six games, including a career-high 14 points versus Auburn. She registered a career-high nine rebounds on three occasions, including Auburn and back-to-back games in the NCAA Tournament against Colgate and DePaul. She narrowly missed three career double-doubles in those games. Two of Sidney's best all-around outings came in big contests for the rookie. She grabbed five timely rebounds and claimed two steals in the upset win over top-ranked Duke. Helped to hold off Georgia in the regular season with eight points and five rebounds in just 12 minutes of action. Solid in SEC play, Sidney recorded 7.7 ppg, 3.5 rpg while connecting on 51% of her field goal tries and 80% of her charity tosses against the conference foes. She became the 19th Lady Vol all-time to be named to the prestigious All-SEC Freshman Team. Earned UT Dean's List honors every semester and was selected to the All-SEC Academic Team.

2004–05: Missed much of the season after suffering a torn ACL in her right knee during practice on Feb. 23. And underwent surgery on March 14. Averaged 5.2 ppg and 4.0 rpg for her 25-game season and shot 80 percent from the free throw line. Started the first 11 games of the season and 13 games overall. Was a key part of the overtime win at Florida, totaling a season-high 11 points to go along with seven rebounds and a career-high two blocks. She went 9-of-9 from the free throw line against the Gators, one of seven games where she was perfect from the line. Nearly posted her first career double-double with a season-high 11 points and eight rebounds in the win against DePaul. Had a solid all-around effort in the victory at N.C. State, totaling eight points, four rebounds, a career-high four assists and two steals in 19 minutes of play. Earned her first career start in the win at Chattanooga, totaling six points, seven rebounds and a block. Earned Dean's List honors after recording a 3.64 GPA in sport management during the fall. Earned a spot on the Lady Vol Honor Roll and named to the SEC All-Academic Team.

2005–06: Offered a career-high seven assists against Rutgers to help UT advance to its fifth straight Elite Eight. She hit all of her first half three-point attempts (4) and finished with a career-high tying 21 points in the SEC Championship game against LSU. Chosen to the SEC All-Tournament Team after averaging 13.0 ppg in the three contests and shot 69 percent from beyond the arc in the SEC Tournament. Left the Arkansas game with a hyper-extended knee, the same knee she had surgically repaired last season, but returned to practice the next day healthy and ready to go. Named the Philips Player of the Game for her efforts against Mississippi after she recorded an SEC career-high 18 points and a then-season-high seven rebounds against the Lady Rebels. Against Mississippi State she scored in double figures for the third consecutive game for the first time in her career. Recorded her best career back-to-back performances against Connecticut (21 points, 6 rebounds) and Georgia (17 points, 3 rebounds). Garnered Lady Vol Athlete of the Week honors on Jan 9 for her efforts against ODU, South Carolina and Connecticut. Named the Philips Player of the Game after a career-high 21-point performance against Connecticut. Was perfect (5–5) from beyond the arc and from the line (4–4). Her five three-pointers tie for the most ever in a game by a Lady Vol junior. Added six rebounds, two assists and a block against the Huskies. Started for the first time this season against Temple. Gave Tennessee its first lead against George Washington and finished that game with seven points. Provided a valuable 20 minutes against Stanford, during which she scored five points and grabbed two rebounds. Scored 12 points on 4-of-7 shooting from the field, including 2-for-2 from beyond the arc against the Longhorns. Grabbed four rebounds and added an assist against Texas. Made arguably the game-saving steal with two seconds remaining in the Lady Vol win over Maryland, then sank both free throws to finish with 13 points in the game. She came off the bench for 13 points in just 14 minutes of action against Stetson. Connected on three of her four three-point attempts against the Hatters. She was named to the ESPN The Magazine Academic All-District IV Third Team and earned SEC All-Academic honors for the third straight season.

Tennessee statistics

Source

References

External links
 WNBA.com Player Profile
 Tennessee Lady Vols bio

1985 births
Living people
American expatriate basketball people in Poland
American expatriate basketball people in Slovakia
American women's basketball players
Basketball players from Alabama
Guards (basketball)
Los Angeles Sparks draft picks
Los Angeles Sparks players
New York Liberty players
People from Hoover, Alabama
Phoenix Mercury players
Tennessee Lady Volunteers basketball players